Graham Oddie is a New Zealand philosopher who lives and works in the United States.  He has been Professor of Philosophy at the University of Colorado since 1994.

Biography
Oddie was educated at the University of Otago, where he received a first class honors degree in philosophy, and at the London School of Economics, where he received a PhD in logic and philosophy of science (1979). His teachers at the University of Otago included Pavel Tichý and Alan Musgrave, and at the LSE, John Watkins (his supervisor), and Colin Howson.  Before moving to the United States he held positions at the University of Otago Oddie wrote a PhD on his new idea of truthlikeness which transformed into his book, Likeness to Truth. and Massey University (where he was Professor and Chair of Philosophy from 1988 to 1994). At the University of Colorado he was elected Chair of Philosophy in 1997, and appointed Associate Dean for Humanities and the Arts in 2002. He is a past President of the Australasian Association of Philosophy, and has held visiting positions at the University of Helsinki, Tantur Institute Jerusalem, the University of London, the Australian National University, the University of Sydney, the University of Canterbury, and Oxford University.

Oddie is best known for his work in the theory of value—including the nature of value, the logic of value and our knowledge of value. He is also known for work on cognitive values (truth, truthlikeness and probability). His books include Likeness to Truth (the first monograph on the notion of verisimilitude, or closeness to the truth), and Value, Reality, and Desire (an extended defense of the thesis that value is real and irreducible).

Publications

Books
Likeness to Truth, (Reidel, 1986), .
Justice, Ethics and New Zealand Society, co-edited with Roy Perrett, (Oxford University Press, 1992), .
What's Wrong? Applied Ethicists and Their Critics, co-edited with David Boonin, (Oxford University Press, 2004 and 2009), .
Value, Reality and Desire (Oxford University Press, 2005 and 2009), .

Selected papers 
“Thinking Globally, Acting Locally: Partiality, Preferences and Perspective”, Les Ateliers De L’Éthique (La Revue de Créum) Volume 9, numéro 2, été 2014, pp. 57–81.
"The content, consequence and likeness approaches to verisimilitude: compatibility, trivialization, and underdetermination", Synthese June 2013, Volume 190, Issue 9, pp 1647–1687.
"Truthlikeness", The Stanford Encyclopedia of Philosophy (Summer 2014 Edition), Edward N. Zalta (ed.)
“The fictionalist’s attitude problem”, (with Dan Demetriou) in Ethical Theory and Moral Practice, (2007), 10: 485-98.

References 

Living people
New Zealand philosophers
University of Otago alumni
Alumni of the London School of Economics
Academic staff of the University of Otago
Academic staff of the Massey University
University of Colorado faculty
Year of birth missing (living people)